List of rivers flowing in the western part of Timor island, which is in the territory of Indonesia.
For the eastern part of Timor island, see East Timor.

In alphabetical order

See also
 List of rivers of Indonesia
 List of rivers of Lesser Sunda Islands

References

 
West Timor
West Timor
Rivers West Timor